Dejan Ristanović (Belgrade, 16 April 1963), is a well known Serbian writer and computer publicist.

In January 1981 he wrote the first article on personal computers for the popular science magazine Galaksija (Galaxy). During the following years he wrote many articles about programmable calculators and home computers.

In December 1983 he wrote a special edition of Galaksija called "Computers in Your Home" (Računari u vašoj kući), the first computer magazine in former Yugoslavia. This issue featured entire schematic diagrams guides on how to build computer Galaksija, created by Voja Antonić.

The series of special editions was eventually developed into computer magazine Računari (Computers). Ristanović was a contributor of Računari for 11 years. After that, in 1995 Ristanović founded the PC Press publishing company and magazine PC, the first privately owned computer magazine in Serbia. Ristanović has been the editor-in-chief of PC for more than 10 years.

In 1989 he co-founded Sezam BBS, which eventually become a major BBS system and evolved to Internet provider Sezam Pro, which in 2009 merged in Orion Telecom.

Dejan Ristanović is the author of about 20 books and more than 500 magazine articles about computers, written in the Serbian and English languages. He also operates the www.ti59.com nostalgia home page of TI-59 programmable calculators.

Dejan Ristanović is alumnus of Mathematical Gymnasium Belgrade, graduated in 1981 (search term in the list: "Ристановић Дејан").

References

External links 
 Dejan Ristanović's home page 
 Dejan Ristanovic's home page 
 List of publications
 TI-59 page
 Sezam Pro Internet provider
 Orion Telecom
 Mathematical Gymnasium Belgrade

Magazine founders
Serbian technology writers
Computer programmers
Serbian businesspeople
Serbian journalists
Galaksija (computer)
Living people
Year of birth missing (living people)
Serbian magazine editors